In mathematics,  antiholomorphic functions (also called antianalytic functions) are a family of  functions closely related to but distinct from holomorphic functions.

A function of the complex variable z defined on an open set in the complex plane is said to be antiholomorphic if its derivative with respect to  exists in the neighbourhood of each and every point in that set, where  is the complex conjugate. 

A definition of antiholomorphic function follows: "[a] function  of one or more complex variables  [is said to be anti-holomorphic if (and only if) it] is the complex conjugate of a holomorphic function ."

Also, a function f(z) is antiholomorphic on an open set D if and only if the function  is holomorphic on D.

If a function is both holomorphic and antiholomorphic, then it is constant on any connected component of its domain.

References

Complex analysis
Types of functions